Medi Eira Harris (born 15 September 2002) is a Welsh international swimmer competing for Great Britain and Wales in backstroke and freestyle. She was part of the gold medal-winning women's 4x100 freestyle relay team at the 2022 European Aquatics Championships. Representing Wales at the 2022 Commonwealth Games, she won a bronze medal in the women's 100 metre backstroke.

Biography
Harris won two medals at the 2022 British Swimming Championships: gold in the 100m backstroke , and silver in the 50m backstroke She subsequently represented Great Britain at the 2022 World Aquatics Championships.

She was selected for the 2022 Commonwealth Games in Birmingham, where she competed in two events: the women's 50m backstroke and the women's 100m backstroke, winning a bronze medal in the latter.

At the 2022 European Aquatics Championships in Rome, she won a silver medal in the final of the Women's 100 metre backstroke and another as a member of the British team in the Women's 4 × 200 metre freestyle relay. At the same championships, she won gold as a member of the British Women's 4 × 100 metre freestyle relay team, and bronze as a member of the Mixed 4 × 100 metre medley relay team.

References

External links
 
 
 
 
 

2002 births
Living people
Welsh female swimmers
British female swimmers
Commonwealth Games bronze medallists for Wales
Commonwealth Games medallists in swimming
Swimmers at the 2022 Commonwealth Games
European Aquatics Championships medalists in swimming
21st-century Welsh women
People from Porthmadog
Sportspeople from Gwynedd
Medallists at the 2022 Commonwealth Games